Khawbung is a village in the Champhai district in the Indian state of Mizoram. It is the administrative centre of Khawbung rural development block and Khawbung assembly constituency which has been renamed as the 25 East Tuipui Constituency.

Khawbung is an administrative block headquarters headed by a Block Development Officer (BDO). There are 25 villages with a total population of 22,139 (11295 males and 10844 females) under the Khawbung RD Block. The area is physically bound by the lakes of R.Tuipui and R.Tiau. The geographic location of Khawbung is relatively higher than the rest of the state.

Geography

References

Villages in Khawbung block